Hooking is a concept in computer programming dealing with control flow.

Hooking may also refer to:

 Hooking (ice hockey), an ice hockey penalty
 Hooking (sex trade), the act of engaging in sexual activity in exchange for money or goods
 Rug hooking, a craft where rugs are made by pulling loops of yarn or fabric through a stiff woven base

See also
 Bondage hook
 Fish-hooking
 Hook (disambiguation)
 Hooked (disambiguation)
 Hooker (disambiguation)
 Hooks (disambiguation)